Taken on Strength is a British and British Commonwealth term referring to a person being added to a military organization, or in some cases becoming an employee of a government department, agency or statutory corporation.

For an aircraft or a vessel, it is the date put into operational service.

To Strike off Strength is when a person leaves military service or civil service, or when the aircraft or vessel leaves operational service.

References

Military terminology